The following is a complete discography for American singer and actress Doris Day. Day's  entertainment career spanned almost 50 years. She started her career as a big band singer in 1939 and gained popularity with her first hit recording, "Sentimental Journey" in 1945. In her solo career she recorded more than 650 recordings on the Columbia Records label from 1947 to 1967. She was one of the most popular and acclaimed singers of the 20th century.



Chart hits

* "Sorry" made the US AC chart at No. 19.

Albums

10" LP
You're My Thrill (1949)
Young Man with a Horn (1950, soundtrack with Harry James)
Tea for Two (1950, soundtrack)
Lullaby of Broadway (1951, soundtrack)
On Moonlight Bay (1951, soundtrack)
I'll See You in My Dreams (1951, soundtrack)
By the Light of the Silvery Moon (1953, soundtrack)
Calamity Jane (1953, soundtrack with Howard Keel)
Young at Heart (1954, soundtrack with Frank Sinatra)

12" LP and/or CD
Love Me or Leave Me (1955, soundtrack)
Day Dreams (1955, expanded re-issue of You're My Thrill)
Day By Day (1956)
The Pajama Game (1957, soundtrack)
Day by Night (1957)
Hooray for Hollywood (2-record set, 1958)
Cuttin' Capers (1959)
Listen to Day (1960)
What Every Girl Should Know (1960)
Show Time (1960)
Bright and Shiny (1961)
I Have Dreamed (1961)
Doris Day's Greatest Hits (1958)
Duet (with André Previn, 1962)
You'll Never Walk Alone (1962)
Billy Rose's Jumbo (1962, soundtrack with film cast)
Annie Get Your Gun (1963, with Robert Goulet)
Love Him (1963)
The Doris Day Christmas Album (1964)
With a Smile and a Song (1964)
Latin for Lovers (1965)
Doris Day's Sentimental Journey (1965)
The Love Album (released in 1994)
My Heart (2011)

Singles 
Hit records:
(with Les Brown's Band of Renown)
"Sentimental Journey"
5,000,000+ sales
"My Dreams Are Getting Better All The Time"
1,000,000+ sales
(As a solo performer)
"It's Magic"
1,000,000+ sales
"Again"
"Love Somebody" (duet with Buddy Clark)
1,000,000+ sales
"Confess" (duet with Buddy Clark) (also done by Patti Page)
"Bewitched"
1,000,000+ sales
"Shanghai"
"Sugarbush" (duet with Frankie Laine)
1,000,000+ sales
"Mister Tap Toe"
"Secret Love"
1,000,000+ sales
"If I Give My Heart to You" (also done by Denise Lor)
"I'll Never Stop Loving You"
1,000,000+ sales
"Whatever Will Be, Will Be (Que Sera, Sera)" ("Que Sera, Sera")
1,000,000+ sales
"Everybody Loves a Lover"
"Move Over Darling"

See also
List of songs recorded by Doris Day

References 

Discographies of American artists
Discography